Tamsil Sanjaya (born 22 February 1987) is an Indonesian professional footballer who currently plays as a midfielder for Persik Kediri in the Indonesia Super League.

External links
 
 Player profil at goal.com
 Player profil at ligaindonesia.co.id

1987 births
Living people
Indonesian footballers
Liga 1 (Indonesia) players
Persik Kediri players
Association football midfielders